My Sweet Monster (Бука. Моё любимое чудище) is a Russian animated musical film directed by Viktor Glukhushin and Maksim Volkov. The film was produced by CTB Film Company. The film was released in Russia on April 28, 2022.

The U.S. release of the English dub by Lionsgate features the voices of Haylie Duff, Jon Heder, and Pauly Shore.

Cast

Reception 
Common Sense Media said that "The songs are fine. Though the story is a little complex, it eventually comes together for a decent yet abrupt fairy tale ending. Overall, it's standard stuff that most kids have seen before."

References

External links

Russian animated films
2023 animated films
2023 in Russian cinema
Russian musical films